Asena Tuğal (born 28 August  1984) is a Turkish television journalist and actress. She presented on TGRT, Kanal D and Show TV in Turkey and on Rai Uno in Italy after having spent six years behind the scenes.

In 2006, Tuğal was selected 3rd runner up in the Miss Turkey beauty pageant. She went on to participate in the 2006 Miss International pageant.

Biography
Tuğal received her bachelor's degree from Boğaziçi University with a double major in Maths and Science.  She was awarded a Young Scientist Award from the Scientific and Technological Research Council of Turkey in the field of Chemistry.

Tuğal had a guest actress role in the TV comedy series "Akasya Durağı", which debuted in 2008 and broadcast by Kanal D. She played the character "Hande" in the 2009 TV drama series "Ömre Bedel" (Fox TV Turkey). In the TV high school series "Öğretmen Kemal" (Fox TV, 2010), she had a leading role as "Nehir".

Tuğal holds the black belt in taekwondo and competes on Turkey's national taekwondo team.

She also has a passion for origami.

TV series

References 

1984 births
Models from Istanbul
Living people
Turkish beauty pageant winners
Turkish women journalists
Boğaziçi University alumni
Turkish female taekwondo practitioners
Turkish television actresses
Turkish female martial artists
Turkish film actresses
Television people from Istanbul